is a passenger railway station located in the town of Ninomiya, Kanagawa Prefecture, Japan, operated by the East Japan Railway Company (JR East).

Lines
Ninomiya Station is served by the Tōkaidō Main Line, and is located 73.1 kilometers from the terminus of the line at Tokyo Station. Trains of the Shōnan-Shinjuku Line also make use of the station.

Station layout
The station consists of a single island platform with an elevated station building built over the tracks and platform. The station has a Midori no Madoguchi staffed ticket office.

Station layout

Station history
Ninomiya Station first opened on April 15, 1902, as a station for both freight and passenger service on the Tōkaidō Main Line. The initial station was destroyed on March 10, 1945, in an American air raid during World War II. Regularly scheduled freight services were discontinued in 1971, and parcel services by 1972. The current station building was completed in October 1982. With the dissolution and privatization of the JNR on April 1, 1987, the station came under the control of the East Japan Railway Company. Automated turnstiles using the Suica IC Card system came into operation from November 18, 2001.

Passenger statistics
In fiscal 2019, the station was used by an average of 13,165 passengers daily (boarding passengers only).

The passenger figures (boarding passengers only) for previous years are as shown below.

Surrounding area
Ninomiya Town Hall

Ninomiya High School

See also
List of railway stations in Japan

References

Yoshikawa, Fumio. Tokaido-sen 130-nen no ayumi. Grand-Prix Publishing (2002) .

External links

Official home page.

Railway stations in Kanagawa Prefecture
Railway stations in Japan opened in 1908
Shōnan-Shinjuku Line
Ninomiya, Kanagawa